The Emergency Powers (Defence) Act 1939 was emergency legislation passed just prior to the outbreak of World War II by the Parliament of the United Kingdom to enable the British Government to take up emergency powers to prosecute the war effectively. It contained clauses giving the government wide powers to create Defence Regulations which regulated almost every aspect of everyday life in the country. Two offences under the regulations were punishable with death.

Passage
The Act was passed in reaction to the Nazi–Soviet Pact of 23 August 1939 and provided the government with powers from 24 August 1939. It was originally intended to be in force for only one year, and made general provision for prosecuting the war effort. In particular, it provided for the following:

Emergency Powers (Defence) Act 1940
The Emergency Powers (Defence) Act 1940 extended the 1939 Act for another year, and provided for annual extensions by parliamentary resolution. It significantly extended the government's powers under the Defence Regulations to require persons "to place themselves, their services and their property at the disposal of His Majesty."

The Emergency Powers (Defence) (No. 2) Act 1940 enabled the creation of special courts to administer criminal justice in war zones, as well as authorizing them to punish offenders for violating the Defence Regulations.

Repeal
The Act was repealed on 25 March 1959 by the Emergency Laws (Repeal) Act 1959, but the last of the Defence Regulations did not expire until 31 December 1964.

See also
Treachery Act 1940
Defence of the Realm Act 1914
Capital punishment in the United Kingdom

References

Bibliography

External links
Defence Regulations - Emergency Powers (Defence) Act - includes text of the Act from The Times, 25 August 1939.
Emergency Powers (Defence) Acts, 1939 and 1940 - text of the preamble and body of the 1940 act, published in Comparative Law Series, Vol. III, No. 7, July 1940, U.S. Department of Commerce.

United Kingdom Acts of Parliament 1939
Emergency laws in the United Kingdom
1939 in British law
United Kingdom in World War II
United Kingdom military law
1939 in military history
World War II legislation